Carn na Caim (941 m) is a mountain in the Grampian Mountains of Scotland. It lies on the border of Highland and Perth and Kinross, east of the Pass of Drumochter.

Located on a high plateau, Carn na Caim is the higher of the two Munros above the Pass. The climb to the summit is soggy in many places around the peak, but the views from the top are fine.

References

Mountains and hills of Perth and Kinross
Mountains and hills of Highland (council area)
Marilyns of Scotland
Munros